Baula Project is an album by Federico Miranda created in 2005. 
Its objective is to raise public awareness on Baula turtles situation in Costa Rica and the degradation of the environment in general.

Track listing

References

2005 albums